Fabulous Funnies is a 1978–1979 American animated children's show produced for Saturday morning television by Filmation. The show aired for one season from September 9, 1978, to December 1, 1978, on NBC, airing 13 episodes.

The show was an anthology of stories based on American comic strips, including Broom Hilda, Alley Oop, The Captain and the Kids, Nancy, Emmy Lou and (for one episode) Tumbleweeds. The character designs closely mimicked the comic strips, so the animators had to animate in several different styles for the program.

It was noted by critics that the show's comic potential was blunted by NBC's demand that the show promote pro-social messages for the child audience. This was especially noticeable when rowdy characters like the Katzenjammer Kids were obliged to spread messages of politeness and restraint. The Los Angeles Times called the show's moralizing "heavy-handed."

The Fantastic Funnies
In 1980, CBS released a special called The Fantastic Funnies.
Produced by Mendelson-Melendez Productions, it brought back most of the characters from the show, with new ones, most famously Garfield and Peanuts.

Episode structure
Each episode contained Broom Hilda, Alley Oop and The Captain and the Kids, with other segments appearing on a rotating basis. Foozy from Alley Oop served as the show's host, and mainly spoke in rhyme.

Each episode had an overall theme, based on a pro-social message. For example, "Fear" dealt with overcoming trepidation, and included Foozy's narration, "We're here to make one thing clear, a lot of woe comes from undue fear." Other topics included drinking, smoking, schoolwork, health, voting and the environment.

Rights problem
The first episode of Fabulous Funnies aired with a segment based on Tumbleweeds, but Filmation didn't actually have the rights to the strip. The strip's creator, Tom K. Ryan, said that he would give approval for his comic to appear in the show pending a look at the scripts and designs, but the producers believed that he had already given permission. After the first episode aired, Ryan called producer Lou Scheimer and said that he wouldn't sue, as long as the strip didn't appear in any further episodes.

Voice cast
The voice cast included:

 June Foray: Broom Hilda, Sluggo, Ooola, Hans and Fritz Katzenjammer
 Jayne Hamil: Nancy, Emmy Lou
 Alan Oppenheimer: Captain Katzenjammer, Gaylord, Irwin, Grelber, Inspector, Tumbleweeds
 Bob Holt: Alley Oop, King Guzzle, Foozy

Reception
In The Encyclopedia of American Animated Television Shows, David Perlmutter writes: "For the most part, they were effective adaptations on a visual level. However, the advanced age of most of the properties (Katzenjammer dated to 1898, Alley Oop and Nancy to the 1930s, Broom Hilda to 1970) meant that adapting them to the restrictions of television animation in the 1970s required unwelcome compromises to the material that impaired their abilities to tell stories as effectively as they had in the comics." George Woolery agrees in Children's Television: The First Thirty-Five Years that the show "sacrificed humor and fun for preaching."

In Television Cartoon Shows, Hal Erickson adds, "What, pray tell, did the media critics expect when such marvelously uninhibited, havoc-wreaking characters like Alley Oop and the Katzenjammer Kids were required to warn the kids at home to behave like responsible ladies and gentlemen? Especially in the case of the Katzenjammers, the whole point of newspaper strips in the first place was to give rule-bound children (and adults!) a cathartic outlet for their latent antisocial tendencies. With the noblest motivations in mind, Fabulous Funnies managed to rob its characters of their very reason for being."

Episodes
The 13 episodes were:

See also
A primetime TV special called The Fabulous Funnies aired on NBC on February 11, 1968, featuring a salute to famous cartoonists. It was not related in any way to this program.

References

1978 American television series debuts
1979 American television series endings
1970s American animated television series
1970s American anthology television series
American children's animated anthology television series
English-language television shows
Television series by Filmation
Television series by Universal Television
The Katzenjammer Kids
NBC original programming